The National Security Language Initiative (NSLI) is a program introduced by United States President George W. Bush on January 5, 2006 at the U.S. University President's Summit to develop the foreign language skills of American students, especially in "critical-need" foreign languages such as Arabic, Chinese, Russian, Hindi, and Persian. The initiative was given $114 million in fiscal year 2007 and $26.6 million in 2008 to expand programs from kindergarten level to universities. Schools were additionally awarded $750 million for critical language education.

The program is a part of multiple programs promoted by the Department of State's Bureau of Educational and Cultural Affairs (ECA), such as the Fulbright Program, the Gilman Program, and the Critical Language Scholarship Program. The White House has noted in 2011 that ECA alumni number over one million globally, including over 50 Nobel laureates and over 300 current or former heads of state.

History 
NSLI was launched in 2006 by United States President George W. Bush as a means to strengthen national security and expand intercultural dialogue. The languages sponsored by NSLI were described as "critical need" languages for international diplomacy. The program was awarded $114 million in 2007.

From 2006 to 2008, NSLI's first three years in operation, the program offered study abroad opportunities in only Arabic and Mandarin Chinese. Around 1000 scholarships were awarded in total in those three years solely in a short-term summer program.  Since then, NSLI has included 6 new languages as a part of its program: Hindi, Indonesian, Korean, Tajiki Persian, Russian, and Turkish. It has expanded its programs into a summer program and an academic year-long program. As of 2020, NSLI-Y has accumulated a student network of over 6,500 individuals.

Scope of the program
The initiative is coordinated by the State Department, Education Department, Defense Department and the Director of National Intelligence.

The National Security Language Initiative has three broad goals: expand the number of Americans mastering critical need languages and start at a younger age, increase the number of advanced-level speakers of foreign languages, increase the number of foreign language teachers and the resources for them. NSLI for Youth's summer and academic year study abroad programs are open exclusively to American high school students.

Reception

Alumni 
In an Alumni Report conducted by NSLI-Y, 94% of alumni respondents reported the program as a positive experience in their educational careers and 99% labeled it as "the most or one of the most influential educational experiences in their lifetime." Additionally NSLI-Y reports a significant number of alumni attending or have attended prestigious universities in the United States and abroad, in addition of over 100 alumni having careers and internships in agencies of the United States federal government, particularly in the field of diplomacy and national intelligence.

Criticism 
Several college leaders have expressed concern about how large of a role the Pentagon is playing in the initiative and, after the program was announced, the lack of details.

Additionally, criticism was drawn when the program was first announced in a speech by Bush at the United States University Presidents Summit in 2007 when he described foreign language education as a means to "defeat [terrorists] in foreign battlefields so they don't strike us here at home." Bush's intentions were initially viewed as an offense strategy rather than to promote international diplomacy through intercultural dialogue.

See also
Critical Language Scholarship (CLS) Program
Fulbright Program

References

Language education in the United States
Education finance in the United States
United States national security policy
Language policy in the United States
United States Department of State
United States Department of Education
United States Department of Defense